The 1956 Arizona gubernatorial election took place on November 6, 1956. Incumbent Governor Ernest McFarland ran for reelection to a second term. Ernest McFarland defeated longtime The Arizona Republic journalist and Republican nominee Horace B. Griffen in the general election by a wide margin.

Democratic primary

Candidates
 Ernest McFarland, incumbent Governor

Republican primary

Candidates
 Horace B. Griffen, The Arizona Republic journalist
 O. D. Miller, State Senator
 Fred Trump, U. S. Government Staff Consultant to the Anglo American Council on Productivity

Results

General election

Results

References

1956
1956 United States gubernatorial elections
Gubernatorial
November 1956 events in the United States